Alexander Victor Vesia (born April 11, 1996) is an American professional baseball pitcher for the Los Angeles Dodgers of Major League Baseball (MLB). He made his MLB debut with the Miami Marlins in 2020.

Early life
Vesia was born in Alpine, California, to Bob and Cindy. He attended Steele Canyon High School in Spring Valley, California, where he played baseball. In 2014, his senior year, he earned All-East County honors. Undrafted in the 2014 Major League Baseball draft, he enrolled at California State University, East Bay, where he played college baseball.

College career
In 2015, Vesia's freshman season at Cal State East Bay, he started 12 games in which he went 5–4 with a 2.18 ERA over  innings, earning California Collegiate Athletic Association Freshman of the Year honors. As a sophomore in 2016, he made 15 starts, going 7–5 with a 3.30 ERA, striking out 64 batters in  innings, earning All-CCAA Second Team honors. That summer, he played in the Northwoods League for the Mankato MoonDogs. In 2017, Vesia's junior year, he appeared in 14 games (nine starts), pitching to a 4–6 record with a 4.82 ERA. Following the season, he played in the Alaska Baseball League for the Alaska Goldpanners of Fairbanks. As a senior at Cal State East Bay in 2018, he pitched in 14 games (making seven starts) while going 8–2 with a 1.94 ERA and was named to the All-CCAA First Team. After his senior season, he was selected by the Miami Marlins in the 17th round of the 2018 Major League Baseball draft.

Professional career

Miami Marlins
Vesia signed with Miami, making his professional debut with the Gulf Coast League Marlins before earning a promotion to the Batavia Muckdogs. Over  relief innings pitched with the two clubs, he went 4–0 with a 1.35 ERA and 38 strikeouts. In 2018, Vesia began the year with the Clinton LumberKings before earning a promotion to the Jupiter Hammerheads in June and the Jacksonville Jumbo Shrimp in August. Over  relief innings pitched between the three clubs, he went 7–2 with a 1.76 ERA and 100 strikeouts. He was selected to play in the Arizona Fall League for the Salt River Rafters following the season and was named a Fall League All-Star.

On July 22, 2020, it was announced that Vesia had made Miami's 2020 Opening Day roster. He made his MLB debut on July 25 against the Philadelphia Phillies. He was placed on the 10-day injured list on August 2 and missed the rest of the season. He pitched a total of  innings for the Marlins in 2020 in which he gave up nine earned runs and seven walks while striking out five.

Los Angeles Dodgers
On February 12, 2021, the Marlins traded Vesia and Kyle Hurt to the Los Angeles Dodgers in exchange for Dylan Floro. 

On July 31, 2021, Vesia recorded his first career MLB win against the Arizona Diamondbacks. On September 21, 2021, Vesia recorded his first MLB save against the Colorado Rockies. He spent a majority of the 2021 season in the major leagues with the Dodgers with whom he pitched a total of forty innings over 41 games with a 3-1 record, a 3.86 ERA, and 54 strikeouts during the season. Vesia pitched in two games of the 2021 NLDS and five of the six games of the 2021 NLCS, allowing only one run on five hits and three walks while striking out seven in  innings. He pitched a total of nine innings with the Oklahoma City Dodgers when not with Los Angeles.

In 2022, Vesia pitched in 63 games, for a 5–0 record and 2.15 ERA.

References

External links

Cal State East Bay Pioneers bio

1996 births
Living people
Baseball players from California
Major League Baseball pitchers
Miami Marlins players
Los Angeles Dodgers players
Cal State East Bay Pioneers baseball players
Gulf Coast Marlins players
Batavia Muckdogs players
Clinton LumberKings players
Jupiter Hammerheads players
Jacksonville Jumbo Shrimp players
Salt River Rafters players
Oklahoma City Dodgers players
Alaska Goldpanners of Fairbanks players
Mankato MoonDogs players